Dermot Keogh (born 12 May 1945) is Professor of History and Emeritus Jean Monnet Professor of European Integration Studies at University College, Cork.

Bibliography

Church and Politics in Latin America  
Ireland and Europe, 1919 - 1948  
Ireland and the Vatican:The Politics and Diplomacy of Church-State Relations 1922-1960  
Jews In Twentieth Century Ireland:Refugees, Anti-Semitism and the Holocaust   (Awarded the 1999 James S. Donnelly Sr Prize by the American Conference for Irish Studies in the history/social science category)
The Rise of the Irish Working Class:The Dublin Trade Union Movement and Labour Leadership 1890-1914  
Twentieth Century Ireland:Nation and State  
The Vatican, the Bishops and Irish Politics 1919-1939

References

External links
 Keogh's profile entry at UCC
 University College Cork

1945 births
Living people
Academics of University College Cork
20th-century Irish historians
21st-century Irish historians